Kopaniny (German: Krugsreuth) is a village in Karlovy Vary Region, Czech Republic. It is one of the nine town districts of Aš. In 2001 the village had a population of 94.

Geography 
Kopaniny lies 5 kilometres northeast from Aš, about 673 meters above sea level, and is surrounded by forests.

History 
Kopaniny was probably founded in the 12th century, but it is first mentioned in 1315, as a property of the Feiltsch family from Sachsgrün. In the middle of the 14th century village belonged to Neuberg property, and in the late 14th century it was bought by the Zedtwitz.

Landmarks 
 Church of the Sacred Heart from 1890,
 Ruins of the Zedtwitz castle,
 German cemetery with Zedtwitz Tomb.

Gallery

References 

Aš
Villages in Cheb District